Dos Rios or Dos Ríos may refer to:
 Dos Rios, California
 Dos Rios AVA, California wine region in Mendocino County
 Dos Ríos, Chiriquí, Panama
 Battle of Dos Ríos, in Cuba

See also
 Two Rivers (disambiguation)
 Deux Rivières (disambiguation)